Dimitar Zahariev (born October 21, 1928) is a former Bulgarian volleyball player and volleyball coach. He was the head coach of the Bulgaria men's national volleyball team that won the 5th place in the 1964 Olympic Games in Tokyo, in the team's first ever participation in the Olympic games. At club level, he was head coach of the Greek powerhouse Olympiacos from 1980 to 1984 and coached the club to 2 Greek Championships (1981, 1983) and 2 Greek Cups (1981, 1983). He also led Olympiacos to their first ever CEV Champions League Final Four participation in 1981-1982 season (4th place), which was the first ever CEV Champions League Final Four participation by any Greek volleyball club.

External links
 Dimitar Zahariev biography, career highlights and photos in the Bulgarian Volleyball Federation official website (in Bulgarian)
 Dimitar Zahariev bio and career (in Bulgarian)
 Dimitar Zahariev coach of the glorious generation of Bulgarian volleyball in the middle of the twentieth century (in Bulgarian)

References

1928 births
Living people
Bulgarian men's volleyball players
Bulgarian volleyball coaches
Olympiacos S.C. coaches